The 2004 Alpine Skiing World Cup – Men's Downhill season involved 12 events at sites in North America and Europe between November 2003 and March 2004. Austria's Stephan Eberharter won the individual title.

Calendar

Final point standings

In Men's Downhill World Cup 2003/04 all results count.

References
 fis-ski.com

External links
 

World Cup
FIS Alpine Ski World Cup men's downhill discipline titles